Redline Records was an independent record label based in Perth, Australia. Started in the year 2000 as a joint project between the band, Jebediah, and its management company, Naked Ape Management, the label predominantly released recordings of Australian indie bands under licensing agreements. Redline Records was distributed by Shock Records in Australia and New Zealand.

Following the final stage of the label's life, in which two albums and one EP were released in 2004 and 2005, respectively, the label's operations were closed without a press release. Since the cessation of Redline Records, artists from the label's roster have either disbanded, entered a period of hiatus or have moved on to other contractual arrangements.

History
Kevin Mitchell, member of Jebediah, has explained in relation to the formation of the label:

I think we were all pretty naive about what we, what we were achieving—we were having too much fun to get kind of caught up. We'd just released our second album overseas on an independent label; and, spent time in America as an independent act. And that was around about the time where we started our own label, just to, um, release, maybe, release a few, some bands of friends of ours, in bands.

Former staff
Managing director and A&R: Heath Bradby

Deregistration
The official label name, "REDLINE RECORDS AUSTRALIA PTY LTD", was listed as deregistered on the Australian Securities and Investments Commission's "National Names Index" on 18 December 2011.

Artists 
 Jebediah
 Adam Said Galore
 Gyroscope
 Sekiden
 Bob Evans
 Big Heavy Stuff
 Front End Loader
 Blueline Medic
 Idlewild
 Jimmy Eat World
 The Nation Blue

Post-label activity
Bradby, as of 2012, works as the Head of A&R for Warner Music Australia, in addition to overseeing his management company, The Fidelity Corporation.

Following a period of hiatus, Jebediah released its fifth album, Kosciuszko, in 2011, and lead singer and rhythm guitarist, Kevin Mitchell, relocated to Melbourne, Australia. The band entered into an arrangement with a new management company, Catherine Haridy Management, prior to the release of Kosciuszko.

See also
 List of record labels

References

External links
Discogs: Redline Records
Fidelity Corporation
Jebediah discuss Redline Records in a band documentary

Indie rock record labels
Record labels established in 2000
Australian independent record labels